I, Curmudgeon is a 2004 documentary film by Alan Zweig about curmudgeons, himself included.

Self-declared curmudgeons interviewed in the film also include Harvey Pekar, Fran Lebowitz, Mark Eitzel, Cintra Wilson, Bruce La Bruce, Andy Rooney and Scott Thompson.

The film was shot with a camcorder, with Zweig using a mirror to record his own experiences.

Film festivals
The film was selected to the 2004 Hot Docs Canadian International Documentary Festival and received a Silver Hugo at the 2005 Chicago International Film Festival. It also received an honorary mention at the Brooklyn Underground Film Festival, in 2005.

References

External links

English-language Canadian films
Canadian documentary films
Films directed by Alan Zweig
2004 films
Camcorder films
Autobiographical documentary films
2004 documentary films
2000s English-language films
2000s Canadian films